Fas – Ite, Maledicti, in Ignem Aeternum (Latin for "Divine Law – Go, Accursed, into Everlasting Fire") is the fourth full-length album by the black metal band Deathspell Omega. The album takes its title from the Vulgate translation of Matthew 25:41, "discedite a me maledicti in ignem æternum", usually quoted as "ite maledicti in ignem aeternum".

Concept 
The line "Every human being not going to the extreme limit is the servant or the enemy of man" in "A Chore for the Lost" comes from Inner Experience by the French post-surrealist Georges Bataille, a frequent source of lyrical inspiration for Deathspell Omega. Much of the album's lyrics are taken verbatim from the book, as well as his other works Theory of Religion and The Solar Anus. Similarly, the first and or last lines of each song, save for the Obombrations, quote My Mother by Bataille. Music critic Thom Jurek's interpretation is that the use of these texts by the band is "for the purpose of explaining the Devil not as God's mystical antithesis, but as a pure nihilistic humanist construct that is synthesis. It also offers a very concrete view of the "real" theory of Satanism as practiced in Europe." On another interpretation, the album "represents the Bataillean quest for the "critical spasm", while remaining torn as to whether or not what one has just experienced was revolting or gratifying. This pilgrimage for spiritual truth is also a metaphor for Lucifer’s fall, as well as the dematerialization of grace." Further, the title of the second track 'The Shrine of Mad Laughter' is again derived from Bataille, whose "definition of laughter as a response to aversion and horror, and to Ecclesiastes 2:2."

Track listing

References

Deathspell Omega albums
2007 albums